Edward Gibson, 1st Baron Ashbourne  (4 September 1837 – 22 May 1913), was an Anglo-Irish lawyer and Lord Chancellor of Ireland.

Background and education
Born at 22 Merrion Square, Dublin, Gibson was the son of William Gibson J.P. (1808–1872), of Rockforest, County Tipperary, and Merrion Square, Dublin, by his first wife, Louisa, daughter of Joseph Grant, barrister of Dublin. He was the elder brother of John George Gibson, who was also a distinguished lawyer and judge of the High Court. He was educated at Trinity College Dublin, graduating BA in 1858, winning the gold medal in History, English Literature and Political Science. He was also an Auditor and a Gold Medallist of the College Historical Society, and became its president in 1883.

Legal and judicial career
Having been called to the Irish bar in 1860, Gibson was made an Irish Queen's Counsel in 1872 and three years later was elected Conservative Member of Parliament for Dublin University after unsuccessfully contesting Waterford. Enjoying the patronage of Benjamin Disraeli, Sir Stafford Northcote and Lord Randolph Churchill, he was appointed Attorney-General for Ireland in 1877, before being admitted to the Irish Privy Council, and then appointed Lord Chancellor of Ireland in 1885, becoming a British Privy Counsellor that same year.

On his appointment as Lord Chancellor, Gibson was raised to the peerage as Baron Ashbourne, of Ashbourne in the County of Meath in 1885. He was almost single-handedly responsible for the drafting of the Purchase of Land (Ireland) Act 1885 which was commonly known as the Ashbourne Act.

He resigned the Lord Chancellor's office in February 1886 on the return of the Liberals to power, but was reappointed by Lord Salisbury in August of that year. For the next twenty years (with a short interval of three years when Gladstone returned to power in 1892), Lord Ashbourne held office as Lord Chancellor of Ireland, finally retiring at the age of 68. He was highly regarded as a judge even at a time when the Irish Bench boasted such outstanding judges as Gerald FitzGibbon, Hugh Holmes and Christopher Palles. It was in part at least due to his presidency that the Irish Court of Appeal gained a reputation as the strongest court ever to sit in Ireland.

In 1900, Winston Churchill's agent Gerald Christie secured Ashbourne's services to take the chair and introduce the journalist /politician's Dublin lecture on his South African Adventures.

Family
Lord Ashbourne married Frances Maria Adelaide Colles (1849–1926), daughter of barrister Henry Jonathan Cope Colles and his wife Elizabeth Mary, daughter of John Mayne of Dublin, in 1868. Lady Ashbourne was a niece of John Dawson Mayne and granddaughter of Abraham Colles; her sister Anna married another eminent judge Sir Edmund Thomas Bewley

They lived in Fitzwilliam Square and produced four sons, the eldest son and heir being William Gibson, 2nd Baron Ashbourne, and four daughters. One of their daughters, Violet Gibson, made an attempt to assassinate Benito Mussolini in 1926. Lord Ashburne died in London in 1913 and was cremated at Golders Green crematorium, his ashes being placed in Mount Jerome Cemetery, Dublin. In Dublin, he was a member of the Kildare Street Club.

Arms

References

External links
 
 Parliamentary Archives, Papers of Edward Gibson (1837-1913), 1st Baron Ashbourne, of Ashbourne, County Meath

1837 births
1913 deaths
Lord chancellors of Ireland
Lawyers from Dublin (city)
Alumni of Trinity College Dublin
Auditors of the College Historical Society
Gibson, Edward
Gibson, Edward
Gibson, Edward
Gibson, Edward
Gibson, Edward
Members of the Privy Council of Ireland
Members of the Privy Council of the United Kingdom
Members of the Judicial Committee of the Privy Council
1
Burials at Mount Jerome Cemetery and Crematorium
Peers of the United Kingdom created by Queen Victoria